In Norway an act of murder (mord or drap) is, as in other legal systems, illegal and considered a very serious offense.

Categories of murder
Until 2015, murder was classified and punished as follows:

Miscellaneous forms of murder
Assisted suicide is generally illegal in Norway, and will in most cases be treated as planned murder, although the punishment may be milder depending on the circumstances.

Euthanasia (aktiv dødshjelp) has been much debated in Norway. Some groups have expressed that it should be legal in cases where the victim is sane and fully aware of what he or she is asking for. Acts of euthanasia, however, are illegal, and are treated as any other form of assisted suicide.

Current law

In 2015, a new penal code came into force. Murder, and other violent offenses resulting in death, are defined in Chapter 25. Violent offences, etc.

See also
List of murder laws by country

References

Law of Norway
Murder in Norway
Norway